Rhodium(II) acetate  is the coordination compound with the formula Rh2(AcO)4, where AcO− is the acetate ion. This dark green powder is slightly soluble in polar solvents, including water. It is used as a catalyst for cyclopropanation of alkenes. It is a widely studied example of a transition metal carboxylate complex.

Preparation
Rhodium(II) acetate is usually prepared by the heating of hydrated rhodium(III) chloride in acetic acid (CH3COOH): Rhodium(II) acetate dimer undergoes ligand exchange, the replacement of the acetate group by other carboxylates and related groups.
Rh2(OAc)4 + 4 HO2CR → Rh2(O2CR)4 + 4 HOAc

Structure and properties
The structure of rhodium(II) acetate features a pair of rhodium atoms, each with octahedral molecular geometry, defined by four acetate oxygen atoms, water, and a Rh–Rh bond of length 2.39 Å. The water adduct is exchangeable, and a variety of other Lewis bases bind to the axial positions.  Copper(II) acetate and chromium(II) acetate adopt similar structures.

Chemical properties
The application of dirhodium tetraacetate to organic synthesis was pioneered by Teyssie and co-workers. An extensive range of reactions including insertion into  bonds and the cyclopropanation of alkenes and aromatic systems. It selectively binds ribonucleosides (vs. deoxynucleosides) by binding selectively to ribonucleosides at their 2′ and 3′ –OH groups. Rhodium(II) acetate dimer, compared to copper(II) acetate, is more reactive and useful in differentiating ribonucleosides and deoxynucleosides because it is soluble in aqueous solution like water whereas copper(II) acetate only dissolves in non-aqueous solution.

Selected catalytic reactions
Dirhodium tetraacetate is also used as catalyst for insertion into C–H and X–H bonds (X = N, S, O).
Cyclopropanation
 through the decomposition of diazocarbonyl compounds, the intra- and intermolecular cyclopropanation reactions occurs.
Aromatic cycloaddition
 Rhodium acetate catalyzes both two-component cycloaddition as well as three-component 1,3-dipolar cycloadditions.
C–H insertion
 Rh(II)-catalyzed regioselective intramolecular and regiospecific intermolecular C–H insertion into aliphatic and aromatic C–H bonds is a useful method for the synthesis of a diverse range of organic compounds.
Oxidation of alcohols
 Allylic and benzylic alcohols were oxidized to the corresponding carbonyl compounds using tert-butyl hydroperoxide in stoichiometric amounts and Rh2(OAc)4 as catalyst in dichloromethane at ambient temperature.
X–H insertion (X = N, S, O)
 Rh(II) carbenoid reacts with amines, alcohols or thiols to yield the product of a formal intra- or intermolecular X–H bond (X = N, S, O) insertion via the formation of an ylide intermediate.

References

Rhodium compounds
Acetates
Dimers (chemistry)
Chemical compounds containing metal–metal bonds